This is a list of notable left-handed quarterbacks who have played professionally or for a major college program. In gridiron football, quarterbacks have been predominantly right-handed; only 33 left-handed quarterbacks have appeared in the National Football League (NFL). The rarity of left-handed NFL quarterbacks has been a topic of discussion and debate among players, coaches, and analysts.

Left-handed quarterbacks were relatively prominent in the NFL between the 1970s and the 2000s, but became mostly absent from the league after 2010. The most successful have been Pro Football Hall of Fame inductees Steve Young and Ken Stabler, 1988 Most Valuable Player Boomer Esiason, and Pro Bowl selections Frankie Albert, Mark Brunell, and Michael Vick. Tua Tagovailoa, who was drafted in 2020, is currently the NFL's only left-handed quarterback.

List

See also
Left-handed specialist
List of southpaw stance boxers

Notes

References

Handedness and footedness in sports
Gridiron football quarterbacks